Travaglini is a surname. Notable people with the surname include:

Alessia Travaglini (born 1988), Italian volleyball player
Gabriel Travaglini (born 1958), Argentinian rugby union player
Mário Travaglini
Robert Travaglini (born 1952), American politician and lobbyist

Italian-language surnames